Benlettery at , is the 259th–highest peak in Ireland on the Arderin scale.  Benlettery is in the southernmost peak of the Twelve Bens mountain range in the Connemara National Park in Galway, Ireland, and is the 11th-tallest of the core Twelve Bens.  The Ben Lettery An Oige youth hostel is on the southern slopes of Benlettery, off the N59 road to Clifden.

Naming
According to Irish academic Paul Tempan, the townland of Lettery (meaning "wet hillsides") is on the south slope of Benlettery. Tempan notes an alternative name of Bindowglass or "Bendouglas" (meaning "peak of the black stream") was recorded as early as 1684 by Irish historian Ruaidhrí Ó Flaithbheartaigh. Ó Flaithbheartaigh chronicled about a pool of water on the summit which turns the hair white of anyone who washes in it.

Geography

Benlettery is the southernmost peak of the Twelve Bens and lies at its western edge. Benlettery is connected to the range by a high northerly ridge to the peak of Bengower ; this ridge forms a fork which also connects neighboring Benglenisky  to Bengower.  Benlettery is one of the six Bens that form a horseshoe around the valley of the Glencoaghan River (also known as the Glencoaghan Horseshoe).

Unlike most of the other main Bens, Benlettery is below 600-metres in elevation, however, its relative positioning at the southern end of the range, and its "pyramidal" summit (when viewed from the south), means that is often featured as a scenic backdrop to the Ballynahinch Castle and the Ballynahinch Lake.

Ben Lettery Connemara Youth Hostel

On the southern slopes of Benlettery is the 40-bed "Ben Lettery Connemara Youth Hostel" (Benlettery spelt as two words), owned and operated by An Oige, the Irish YHA; it was ranked by Outside.ie as one of the ten best An Oige youth hostels in Ireland.

Hill walking

As with Derryclare , on the east side of the Glencoaghan Horseshoe, Benlettery's accessibility makes is a popular peak as a standalone 5-kilometre 2-3 hour climb (starting and ending at the Ben Lettery An Oige youth hostel); however, the high ridge Benlettery shares with the peaks of Bengower and Benglenisky, means that it is also climbed as part a 7-kilometre 3-4 hour horseshoe loop-walk with these peaks.

Benlettery is part of the 16–kilometre 8–9 hour Glencoaghan Horseshoe, considered one of Ireland's best hill-walks;  and of the even longer Owenglin Horseshoe, a 20–kilometre 10–12 hour route around the Owenglin River taking in over twelve summits.

Gallery

Bibliography

See also

Twelve Bens
Mweelrea, major range in Killary Harbour
Maumturks, major range in Connemara
Lists of mountains in Ireland
Lists of mountains and hills in the British Isles

References

External links
MountainViews: The Irish Mountain Website, Benlettery
MountainViews: Irish Online Mountain Database
The Database of British and Irish Hills , the largest database of British Isles mountains ("DoBIH")
Hill Bagging UK & Ireland, the searchable interface for the DoBIH

Mountains and hills of County Galway
Geography of County Galway
Mountains under 1000 metres